This is a list of fictional stories that, when composed, were set in the future, but the future they predicted is now present or past. The list excludes works that were alternate histories, which were composed after the dates they depict, alternative futures, as depicted in time travel fiction, as well as any works that make no predictions of the future, such as those focusing solely on the future lives of specific fictional characters, or works which, despite their claimed dates, are contemporary in all but name.

List

See also
 Retrofuturism
 List of films set in the future
 List of time travel works of fiction
 List of dates predicted for apocalyptic events

Notes

References

Stories
Lists of stories
 
Fantasy-related lists
Science fiction lists